Euchersadaula tristis is a moth of the family Oecophoridae. It was first described by Alfred Philpott in 1926. This species is endemic to New Zealand.

References

Oecophorinae
Moths of New Zealand
Moths described in 1926
Taxa named by Alfred Philpott
Endemic fauna of New Zealand
Endemic moths of New Zealand